Atomik Harmonik is a pop-folk music group from Kamnik, Slovenia. Their debut single "Brizgalna Brizga" stayed at #1 in the Slovenian pop charts for several months. Their other hits include "Hop Marinka", "Na seniku", "Od hr'ma do hr'ma", and their European hit "Turbo Polka", which hit the charts in Germany and Austria, bringing the group fame across Europe.

Members
Jani Pavec
Miha Ojsteršek
Mateja Poročnik
Anže Turk
Maja Ramšak

Former members
Mateja "Matejči" Mohar (2015–2015)
Uroš Kržan (2011-2011)
Vesna Kociper (2010–2011)
Petra Crnjac (2010–2011)
Gašper Krek (2010–2011)
Darja Gajšek (2010)
Špela Grošelj (2004–2010)
Mateja ("Tejči") Vuk  (19 September 2006 – 2010)
Tomo Primc (2009-2011)
Dejan "Frai Toni" Čelik (2004–2009)
Iris Soban (10 April 2006 – 24 April 2006)
Špela ("Špelca") Kleinlercher (2004–2006)

Singles 
From Brizgaaaaj!:

 2004 "Brizgalna Brizga"
 2005 "Na seniku"

From Brizgaaaaj! Še več in dlje!:

 2005 "Turbo Polka"

From Vriskaaaj!:
 2006 "Polkaholik"

From Traktor polka:
 2011 "Traktor polka"

See also
Turbo Angels

External links 

Slovenian musical groups
Pop-folk music groups